Ashley Hill railway station was a railway station serving the area of Ashley Down in the north of Bristol, England. It was located on what is now known as Filton Bank. It was served by stopping trains to Severn Beach (via Pilning), Avonmouth (via Chittening) and Swindon (via Badminton).
The West of England Combined Authority plan to open a new train station, to be called Ashley Down, on the site of Ashley Hill station, in 2023.

History 
The station was opened in 1864 by the Bristol and South Wales Union Railway, which was absorbed by the Great Western Railway in 1868.  The station passed to the Western Region of British Railways on nationalisation in 1948. It was closed by the British Railways Board in 1964.

The site today 
Trains running between Bristol Temple Meads and Bristol Parkway pass the site.
Remains of one of the platforms are clearly visible.

In 2001 the station was selected to be reopened as "Ashley Down" and used as a stop for the proposed Bristol Supertram project. This was planned to operate as a 30-minute service between Broadmead Shopping Centre and North Bristol, but the project was cancelled in 2004.

Future 
The line through Ashley Hill was to have been electrified in 2017 as part of the Great Western Main Line electrification project, but this work has been postponed indefinitely. The route was however restored to four-tracks, which will allow more services between Parkway and Bristol Temple Meads, and separate fast inter-city services from local stopping services.

The West of England Combined Authority plan to open a new train station on the site of Ashley Hill station, as part of the MetroWest scheme.
The reopening is supported by Bristol City Council, Network Rail, local MPs and local rail groups, and will provide rail access to local colleges and to the County Ground, home of Gloucestershire County Cricket Club. The new station was initially ruled out by Network Rail due to modern regulations regarding the track gradient in stations, and also due to the high cost of removing an embankment. However in January 2018, it was revealed that plans had been revived to reopen the station as part of the reopening of Henbury Spur.

Following the Bristol City Council meeting of 20 June 2019, Ashley Hill was cited as a station of main interest in MetroWest, with an opening date expected by 2023. The new station, to be called Ashley Down, will be served by hourly services to Henbury calling at Filton Abbey Wood, North Filton and Henbury on the way north, and Stapleton Road, Lawrence Hill and Bristol Temple Meads on its way south. Construction started in March 2023; completion is expected in 2024.

References 

 
 

Disused railway stations in Bristol
Former Great Western Railway stations
Railway stations in Great Britain opened in 1864
Railway stations in Great Britain closed in 1964
Beeching closures in England